William "Willie" S. Cronan (October 23, 1883 – October 22, 1959) was a boatswain's mate serving in the United States Navy during the first half of the twentieth century who was awarded the Medal of Honor for peacetime bravery in 1906.

Biography

The combination of the explosion and the scalding steam killed a number of men outright and left others mortally wounded; the final death toll was one officer, Ensign Newman K. Perry and sixty-five men, making it one of the U.S. Navy's worst peacetime disasters. Nearly all of the forty-six who survived had an injury of some sort. Wounded himself, Cronan saved three of his shipmates from drowning, the third, after Cronan escaped from triage. For his actions Boatswain's Mate Cronan was awarded the peacetime Medal on  January 5, 1906, by President Theodore Roosevelt. He retired with the rank of Lieutenant Commander in the 1940s.

He died October 22, 1959, and is buried in Fort Rosecrans National Cemetery San Diego, California. His grave can be found in section T, grave 534.

Medal of Honor citation
Rank and organization: Boatswain's Mate, U.S. Navy. Born: 23 October 1883, Chicago, Ill. Accredited to: Illinois. G.O. No.: 13, 5 January 1906.

Citation:

Serving on board the U.S.S. Bennington, for extraordinary heroism displayed at the time of the explosion of a boiler of that vessel at San Diego, Calif., 21 July 1905.

See also

List of Medal of Honor recipients during Peacetime

References

External links

1883 births
1959 deaths
United States Navy Medal of Honor recipients
United States Navy sailors
People from Chicago
Non-combat recipients of the Medal of Honor
Burials at Fort Rosecrans National Cemetery